See also Esperance (disambiguation)
Espérance  is one of the two French words that can be translated into "hope", the other being "espoir". Whereas the latter is closer to the idea of "dream" or "fantasy" and corresponds to most of the common uses of "hope", "espérance" refers to an abstract, positive expectation. It is rarely used compared to its counterpart, except in the field of mathematics, where it refers to the Expected value, and in religious texts. The name is used for organizations in many Francophone countries.

Places
Espérance, French Guiana, a village near Saint-du-Maroni, French Guiana
Espérance, Mauritius, a village in the district of Moka, Mauritius
Esperance, Western Australia, a town in Western Australia 

Union
Espérance Club, a trade union for girl dressmakers in 19th and early 20th century London, England

Sports clubs
Espérance Football Club, Rwandan football club
Espérance Guider, Cameroonian football club
Espérance Sportive de Tunis, Tunisian football club 
Espérance Sportive de Zarzis, Tunisian football club
Espérance Sportive Troyes Aube Champagne, French football club

Ship
French ship Espérance (1781)

See also
L'Espérance (disambiguation)